Sheffield & District Reform Jewish Congregation (Hebrew name: Kehillat Shivah Harim – "Seven Hills Shul") is a Reform Jewish community in Sheffield, South Yorkshire, England. It was founded in 1989 and is affiliated to the Movement for Reform Judaism. The congregation holds services at a local community centre and also meets in members' houses.

See also
 List of Jewish communities in the United Kingdom
 List of former synagogues in the United Kingdom
 Movement for Reform Judaism

References

External links
 Official website
 Movement for Reform Judaism – Synagogue Directory: Sheffield & District Reform Congregation
 Jewish Small Communities Network: Sheffield & District Reform Jewish Congregation
 Sheffield & District Reform Congregation on Jewish Communities and Records – UK (hosted by JewishGen)

1989 establishments in England
Religious buildings and structures in Sheffield
Reform synagogues in the United Kingdom